

Summary

|-bgcolor=#F6F6F6
| colspan=2 style="text-align: right; margin-right: 1em" | Total
| style="text-align: right;" | 98
| colspan=5 |
| style="text-align: right;" | 462,244
| style="text-align: right;" | 
|-
|}

Division results

Basildon

Braintree

Brentwood

Castle Point

Chelmsford

Colchester

Epping Forest

Harlow

Maldon

Rochford

Southend

Tendring

Thurrock

Uttlesford

References

Essex County Council elections
1981 English local elections
1980s in Essex